The Canadian Football Network (CFN) was the official television syndication service of the Canadian Football League from 1987 to 1990.

History

Background 
CFN broadcasts mainly aired on stations via the Atlantic Satellite Network and future Global Television Network affiliates, in addition to at least one station in the United States (ABC  affiliate WVNY-TV in Burlington, Vermont, which serves the larger, nearby Montreal English-language television market, which did not have a Global station at that time). As CFN was formed by the CFL itself, the league provided much of the network's funding. It was created directly in response to CTV completely dropping their CFL coverage following the 1986 season. CFN was conceptualized by then CFL Commissioner Douglas Mitchell.

Hamilton and Toronto 
In its first year on the air, the CFL experimented with the TV blackout policy as four games (two in Hamilton and two in Toronto) were televised in the Hamilton-Toronto market.

CFN in the United States 
In addition to being shown on the above-mentioned Burlington, Vermont station, from 1987-1989, a weekly CFN game telecast, including playoffs and the Grey Cup championship, aired in the United States nationally on a tape-delay basis on ESPN.

Grey Cup coverage 

CFN's Grey Cup coverage was completely separate from CBC's coverage (whereas from 1971-1986, CBC and CTV fully pooled their commentary teams for the game; CBC's commentators called the first half of the game while CTV's crew called the rest of the game or vice versa).

During its broadcast of the 1988 Grey Cup game, CFN reported that its telecasts that season were seen in 14 countries, including the U.S., Great Britain, France, Italy, Spain, West Germany, Norway, Sweden and Finland.

The 1988 Grey Cup was the last game for veteran Winnipeg Blue Bombers offensive lineman Nick Bastaja. The next season, he joined the CFN crew as a colour commentator. Former Edmonton Eskimos fullback Neil Lumsden was CFN's primary colour man, while Dave Hodge and Bob Irving, a long-time voice of the Blue Bombers, provided play-by-play.

The end of CFN 
CFN was critically acclaimed, credited for raising the production quality of CFL telecasts (which was sorely lacking in the mid- to late-1980s) to near-NFL calibre levels. However, it did not do well financially (most of the rights fees the CFL made from CBC and TSN were diverted to cover the CFN's expenses), and the league discontinued the network after the 1990 season. CFN was also supposed to work like a normal television network in that it was meant to get its money solely from sponsors. After the CFN shut down, all playoff and Grey Cup games would be exclusively broadcast on CBC Television from 1991 to 2007 and TSN from 2008 to the present and into the foreseeable future.

Commentators 
Play-by-play/pregame hosts
Dave Hodge
Bob Irving

Colour commentators/Pregame analysts
Nick Bastaja
Ian Beckstead
Jan Carinci
Joe Faragalli
Dan Kepley 
Lary Kuharich 
Tom Larscheid
Neil Lumsden
Mike Riley
Mike Clemons

The theme music package for CFN was provided by Donald Quan.

See also 
 1987 CFL season
 1988 CFL season
 1989 CFL season
 1990 CFL season

References

External links 
 CFL.ca Network
 The Sports Arena
 rec.sport.football.canadian

Canadian Football League on television
1980s Canadian sports television series
1990s Canadian sports television series
1987 Canadian television series debuts
1990 Canadian television series endings
Television syndication packages
Defunct broadcasting companies of Canada
Simulcasts
ESPN original programming
Television channels and stations established in 1987
Television channels and stations disestablished in 1990